Joseph Francis Stadler (June 12, 1880 – February 25, 1950) was an American athlete who competed mainly in the standing high jump.

He competed for the United States in the 1904 Summer Olympics held in St Louis, United States in the standing high jump where he won the silver medal. He also won a bronze medal in the standing triple jump in both events he finished behind Ray Ewry.

References

External links
 Joseph Stadler's profile at Sports Reference.com

1880 births
1950 deaths
American male high jumpers
American male triple jumpers
Olympic silver medalists for the United States in track and field
Olympic bronze medalists for the United States in track and field
Athletes (track and field) at the 1904 Summer Olympics
Medalists at the 1904 Summer Olympics